The Afghanistan–China border is a  boundary between Afghanistan and China, beginning at the tripoint of both countries with the Pakistan's federally administered territory of Gilgit-Baltistan, following the watershed along the Mustagh Range, and ending at the tripoint with Tajikistan. This short border is in the far northeast of Afghanistan, distant from much of the country or urban areas in either country, at the end of the long, narrow Wakhan Corridor. The Chinese side of the border is in the Chalachigu Valley. The border is crossed by several mountain passes, including Wakhjir Pass in the south and Tegermansu Pass in the north.

Both sides of the border are protected areas: Wakhan National Park in Wakhan District, Badakhshan Province on the Afghan side and Taxkorgan Nature Reserve in Taxkorgan Tajik Autonomous County, Kashgar Prefecture, Xinjiang Uygur Autonomous Region on the Chinese side.

The border marks the greatest terrestrial time zone difference on Earth, with a 3.5 hour difference between Afghanistan's UTC+4:30 and China's UTC+08:00.

History
The border area was a thoroughfare on the Silk Road. It is believed that the famous Chinese Buddhist pilgrim Xuanzang traveled this pass on his return trip back to China around 649 AD.

The border was established between Afghanistan and China in an agreement between the British and the Russians in 1895 as part of the Great Game, although the Chinese and Afghans did not finally agree on the border until 1963. The Kingdom of Afghanistan and the People's Republic of China demarcated their border in 1963.

It is believed that in more recent times, the main pass, Wakhjir Pass, is sometimes used as a low intensity drug smuggling route, and is used to transport opium made in Afghanistan to China. In the 2000s, Afghanistan has asked China on several occasions to open the border in the Wakhan Corridor for economic reasons or as an alternative supply route for fighting the Taliban insurgency. However, China has resisted, largely due to unrest in its far western province of Xinjiang, which borders the corridor. , it was reported that the United States had asked China to open the corridor.

There have been proposals and plans by Kashgar regional government to open Tegermansu Pass as a port of entry for economic purposes since the 1990s. However, this has yet to happen.

Geography

Article 1 of the 1963 treaty describes the Afghanistan–China border, starting from the southern end:

The border's northern terminus is found at the Afghanistan-China-Tajikistan tripoint on Povalo-Shveikovskogo Peak / Kokrash Kol Peak (Kekelaqukaole Peak), the easternmost point of Afghanistan.

Border crossings

Historically, the main crossing between the two sides was Wakhjir Pass. Wakhjir Pass has been in use for at least a millennium since the Silk Road. In addition to Wakhjir Pass, there is also Tegermansu Pass which is located on the far eastern end from Little Pamir.

The passes are closed as Chalachigu Valley, the valley on the Chinese side, is closed to visitors; however, local residents and herders from the area are permitted to access.

Historical maps and gallery
Historical English-language maps of the Afghanistan–China border, mid to late 20th century:

See also
China–Tajikistan border
China–Pakistan border
Afghanistan–China relations

Notes

References

Further reading
 International Boundary Study No. 89 – May 1, 1969 Afghanistan – China Boundary

 
border
China
Borders of China
International borders